OVB may refer to:

 OVB, the IATA code for Tolmachevo Airport, Novosibirsk, Russia
 Omitted-variable bias
 Otto von Bismarck
 Oberbayerisches Volksblatt, German regional newspaper